John J. Hussey (born February 4, 1964) is an American football official in the National Football League (NFL), who works as a referee. He was hired as a line judge in the 2002 NFL season. Hussey wears uniform number 35.

Hussey officiated in Super Bowl XLV in 2011, and three Championship Games, the 2011 NFC Championship Game between the San Francisco 49ers and the New York Giants and the 2013 AFC Championship Game between the New England Patriots and the Denver Broncos, all as a line judge, and the 2020 NFC Championship game between the Green Bay Packers and the San Francisco 49ers as the referee.

Hussey was promoted to the Referee position for the start of the 2015 NFL season following the retirement of referee Bill Leavy.

His first NFL career game as a Referee was in 2015 was on September 13 in Tampa Bay where he officiated the Tennessee Titans and the Tampa Bay Buccaneers.

Hussey was the referee in the Detroit Lions' 18-16 surprise victory over the Green Bay Packers at Lambeau Field in Green Bay, WI on November 15, 2015, their first in the state of Wisconsin since 1991.

Outside the NFL, Hussey is the CEO and founder of Cuddly, a marketplace platform built specifically for animal welfare groups worldwide to help them fundraise.

2022 crew 

Hussey's 2022 crew consists of:
 Referee: John Hussey
 Umpire: Alan Eck
 Down judge: Robin DeLorenzo
 Line judge: Carl Johnson
 Field judge: Jabir Walker
 Side judge: Allen Baynes
 Back judge: Brad Freeman
 Replay official: Jamie Nicholson
 Replay assistant: Larry Hill

References

1964 births
Living people
National Football League officials
People from San Pedro, Los Angeles